The women's team tournament of the 2014 World Team Table Tennis Championships was held from 28 April–5 May 2014. All matches were held at the Yoyogi National Gymnasium and the Tokyo Metropolitan Gymnasium in Tokyo, Japan.

Medalists

Championship division
The top three teams of each group played for places 1–12.

Preliminary round

Group A

Group B

Group C

Group D

Knockout stage

Places 1–12

Round of 16

Quarterfinals

Semifinals

Final

Places 13–24

Second division
The top three teams of each group played for places 25–36.

Preliminary round

Group E

Group F

Group G

Group H

Knockout stage

Places 25–36

Places 37–48

Third division
The top three teams of each group played for places 49–60.

Preliminary round

Group I

Group J

Group K

Group L

Knockout stage

Places 49–60

Places 61–72

Fourth division
The top three teams of each group played for places 73–84.

Preliminary round

Group M

Group N

Group O

Group P

Knockout stage

Places 73–84

Places 85–94

References

External links
Official website

Women's team